Saar or SAAR has several meanings:

People

Given name 
Saar Boubacar (born 1951), Senegalese professional football player
Saar Ganor, Israeli archaeologist
Saar Klein (born 1967), American film editor

Surname 
Ain Saar (born 1968), Estonian (Võro) punk rocker and freedom fighter
Alison Saar (born 1956), American artist
Anti Saar (born 1980), Estonian children’s writer and translator
Betye Saar (born 1926), American artist
Elmar Saar (1908–1981), Estonian footballer and coach 
Erik Saar, American intelligence officer
Evar Saar (born 1969), Estonian (Võro) non-fiction writer
Ferdinand von Saar (1833–1906), Austrian writer
Getter Saar (badminton) (born 1992), Estonian badminton player
Getter Saar (born 1999), Estonian footballer
Gideon Sa'ar (born 1966), Israeli politician
Heleri Saar (born 1979), Estonian footballer
Indrek Saar (born 1973), Estonian actor and politician
Jüri Saar (born 1956), Estonian politician
Katriin Saar (born 2002), Estonian tennis player
Ketlin Saar (born 1997), Estonian footballer
Leonid Saar (1913–2010), Estonian basketball player, ice hockey player and footballer
Margus Saar (born 1966), Estonian television journalist and producer
Martin Saar (born 1980), Estonian artist
Mart Saar (1882–1963), Estonian composer
Takács de Saár, Hungarian noble family
Tõnu Saar (born 1944), Estonian actor 
Ulla Saar (born 1975), Estonian illustrator, product designer, graphic artist, and interior designer
Valeri Saar (born 1955), Estonian military major general

Places 
Sa'ar, a kibbutz in Israel
Saar, Bahrain, a town in Bahrain
Saar Region and Saar Area—in context, any of the following:
Saarland, a federal state of Germany, often referred to as "the Saar"
Saar (League of Nations), a League of Nations governed territory (1920–35)
Saar Protectorate, a French protectorate (1947–56)
Sarre (département), a French département (1798–1814)
Saar (river), a navigable river running through the borderlands of France and Germany
Saar (Rhine), a tributary of the Alpine Rhine in the Swiss canton of St. Gallen
Saar (Werra), a tributary of the Werra in Thuringia, Germany
Sarre, Aosta Valley, a town and comune in Aosta Valley region of North-Western Italy
South American–Antarctic Ridge, a mid-ocean ridge in the South Atlantic
Žďár nad Sázavou in Moravia, now Žďár nad Sázavou, which was called Saar under the Austrian monarchy

Other uses 
Several classes of Israeli missile boats:
Sa'ar 3-class missile boat
Sa'ar 4-class missile boat
Sa'ar 4.5-class missile boat
Sa'ar 5-class corvette
, a German cargo ship in service 1937–45
German submarine tender Saar, a WWII submarine tender
Rosario - Islas Malvinas International Airport, ICAO airport code: SAAR
SAAR Foundation
Seasonally Adjusted Annual Rate, also Industry SAAR

Estonian-language surnames